Maria Giuseppa Robucci (20 March 1903 – 18 June 2019) was a validated Italian supercentenarian who was, prior to her death at the age of 116, the second-oldest living person in the world behind Kane Tanaka.

Biography
Robucci was born in 1903 in Poggio Imperiale, province of Foggia, Apulia region, Italy. Her parents were Antonio and Maria Michela Robucci. On 3 December 1928, she married Nicola Nargiso. The couple had five children named Angelo, Concetta, Antonio, Giuseppe, and Filomena. Nicola died in 1982. In 2003, her 100th birthday was featured in a television show called ”La vita in diretta” for the channel Rai Uno.

In 2014, Robucci broke her hip after a fall and underwent surgery. She credited her longevity to a good diet such as olive oil and tomatoes, having faith in God, avoiding alcohol and having a positive mindset. On 6 July 2018, she became the oldest person in Italy upon the death of 116-year-old Giuseppina Projetto-Frau.

On 18 June 2019, she died at the age of 116 years, 90 days in Poggio Imperiale.

See also
Emma Morano

References

1903 births
2019 deaths
Italian supercentenarians
Women supercentenarians